Hell is the 38th studio album by American musician James Brown. The album was released on June 28, 1974, by Polydor Records.

Track listing

Personnel
James Brown - lead vocals, arrangements (tracks: A1 to A3, A5, C1, C2, D)
David Matthews - arrangements (tracks: A4, B1 to B5, C3)
Fred Thomas - bass (tracks: A1, A2, D)
Gordon Edwards - bass (tracks: A3, B6 to B10, C13)
Jimmy Madison - drums (tracks: A3, A4, B6 to B10, C13)
John "Jabo" Starks - drums (tracks: A1, A2, D)
John Morgan - drums (tracks: A1, A2, C11)
Technical
Bob Both - production supervision
Ted Pettus - cover design
Joe Belt - artwork

References

1974 albums
James Brown albums
Albums arranged by David Matthews (keyboardist)
Albums produced by James Brown
Polydor Records albums